Sweet Distorted Holiday is the second and final studio album released by Australian electronica music producer Josh Abrahams. It was released in 1998 and peaked at number 59 in Australia and 50 in New Zealand.

At the ARIA Music Awards of 1999, the album won two awards, ARIA Award for Best Dance Release and Best Independent Release.

Track listing

Charts

References 

1998 albums
Josh Abrahams albums
ARIA Award-winning albums